IC 1337 is an intermediate spiral galaxy in the constellation Capricornus. The galaxy is located close to the celestial equator. It was discovered by Stéphane Javelle on July 22, 1892.

References

 NGC/IC Project

1337
65760
-03-53-012
Capricornus (constellation)
Intermediate spiral galaxies